Jianningxian North railway station is a railway station located in Jianning County, Sanming, Fujian, China. It is an intermediate station on the Xiangtang–Putian railway and the northern terminus of the Jianning–Longyan railway.

History
The station opened on 26 September 2013.

References 
 

Railway stations in Fujian
Railway stations in China opened in 2013